The Penang National Park (Malay: Taman Negara Pulau Pinang; تامن نݢارا ڤولاو ڤينڠ; Chinese: 槟城国家公园; Bīnchéng guójiā gōngyuán; Tamil: பினாங்கு தேசியப் பூங்காக்கள்; Piṉāṅku tēciyap pūṅkākkaḷ) spans 1,213ha of land and sea and is used by scientists, researchers, and nature lovers to explore its natural treasures.

Previously known as the Pantai Acheh Forest Reserve, this pristine site is known to harbour 417 flora and 143 fauna species.  Pantai Acheh Forest Reserve, located at the northwestern tip of Penang Island, was declared the Penang National Park in April 2003.

Penang National Park is the first protected area legally gazetted under Malaysia's National Park Act of 1980, signifying the State and Federal governments' environmental protection efforts.

Penang National Park was established to preserve and protect flora and fauna as well as objects with geological, archaeological, historical, ethnological, scientific, and scenic interests.

Natural attractions of Pulau Pinang National Park include the hill / lowland dipterocarp forests, mangrove forest areas, sandy beach habitats, a seasonal meromictic lake and the open coastal seas. Stands of seraya (Shorea curtisii) trees, common feature of coastal dipterocarp forest, can be easily seen on steep slopes around Muka Head. There are over 1000 species of plants recorded which are dominated by the families Dipterocarpaceae, Leguminosae, Apocynaceae, Anacardiaceae, Euphorbiaceae and Moraceae.

Part of the Pantai Acheh Forest Reserve had been logged before 1955; no forest areas there have been logged since 1955.  All logging activities were stopped in 1996, and Malaysian public funding has been allocated to develop the Penang National Park, within guidelines.

Ecology
The unique features here are five habitat types not found in the other major Malaysian nature reserves.  The park is a haven for a wealth of 417 flora and 143 fauna species, including turtles, crustaceans, and rare pitcher plants. This allows the Park to boast one of the most unusual assemblage of biodiversity in Malaysia.

Flora
Secondary forest is the main feature here.  The beach is long, and plants are numerous, including rocky bonsai to timber and herbal plants.  Trees and plants which can be found here include chengal, meranti seraya, jelutong, gaharu, tongkat ali, and bintangor.

The coast is dominated by disturbed secondary forest and hardy plants, such as screw pines.  The red paper-like bark of the pelawan trees are abundant; undergrowth and ferns spread between the trees.  Other noticeable trees planted include casuarina trees, sea almond, cashew nut, and swaying coconut palms.

Several mangrove trees are found along the Tukun beach.  Wild orchids can be sighted on steep rocky slopes and cashew nuts are common here, indicating that some agricultural activities had taken place here many years ago. Fully-grown timber trees are found inside the forest beyond the coast.  There are also pitcher plants (Nepenthes spp.), which managed to survive the coastal habitat.

Fauna
Among animals spotted in and around the park are dolphins, otters, hawksbill turtles, and monkeys.  Dusky leaf monkeys and long-tailed macaques have also been sighted.

Home to 46 species of birds such as stork-billed kingfishers, white-breasted waterhens and great egrets. Other noticeable big birds like white bellied sea eagles, brahminy kites, and kingfisher are occasionally reported.

Mammals such as wild boars, wild cats, civets, Smooth-coated otter, mouse deer, rats, bats, and squirrels and crabs, fishes, and large prawns, monitor lizards, and snakes are common here.  Turtles occasionally land in the park.

The meromictic lake has scarce fauna life, since it is usually deprived of oxygen in the lower layer.  The brackish water sustains snails of Faunus ater, which shell is unique among the Cerithioidea of great population and high density, up to 6700 snails per m2r. This is unique and singular to the park.

The pure, sandy stretch of Pantai Kerachut is also a favourite nesting place of green turtles from April to August, and the olive ridley from September to February.

Beaches

Because of its remote location, the park's nine beaches are considered among the best in Penang.  They are:

Teluk Bahang
Pasir Pandak
Teluk Tukun
Tanjung Ailing
Teluk Duyung (Monkey Beach)
Teluk Ketapang
Pantai Kerachut
Teluk Kampi
Pantai Mas

Teluk Bahang Beach
This is a shady camping ground, and with nearby civilisation, it is used for family outings.  At the Teluk Bahang roundabout, continue straight towards the fishing jetty and you will be able to see a restaurant called "End of the World".  Follow trail 1A from here.  This beach is within walking distance and easily accessible by foot from the jetty and the restaurant.

Teluk Bahang is the area where the Bahang Bay is located.  Often it is confused with the Teluk Bahang township. The panoramic fishing jetty engulfing the backdrop is a rare sight which is built of mangrove timber and palm trunks.

Teluk Tukun
Use trail 1A-1B, and it is about 20 minutes from the End of the World restaurant. The trail is a clear and easy walk along the coast to reach Teluk Tukun beach. Camping grounds are built along Tukun River. Tukun River flows into Teluk Tukun. A small island opposite is Pulau Tukun Tengah. The national park headquarters are situated near here. There are several small swimming pools for campers.

Tanjung Ailing
Follow the coastal trail via Sungai Tukun with trail 1A-1B-1C; it will take about 30 minutes to reach Tanjung Ailing from Teluk Bahang. The near end of the beach is littered with millions of small moon shells of different genetic variations.

Tanjung Ailing houses the USM research centre and the forest and coastal areas are being used for research on bio-technology. There is a jetty to bring in supplies from town. The beach is easily accessible and it is a suitable camping site for campers. It is also a resting place for visitors en route to Muka Head (Teluk Duyung).

Teluk Duyung (Muka Head)
You can walk or take a boat (only during high tide) to Teluk Duyung. You can reach Teluk Duyung about one and half hours from Teluk Bahang by using trail 1A-1B-1C-1D. Teluk Duyung is a beautiful bay protected by the Muka Head's cape.

On Head's peak stands a majestic lighthouse built in 1883. A burial ground of at least 80 years resembles that of Indonesian Acheh and is an interesting historical artefact. The lighthouse peak offers a panoramic view of the surrounding islands.

Teluk Duyung (Monkey Beach)

Monkey Beach is situated in the Penang National Park in the North-western Coast of the Island. It is one of the few pristine beaches left on the Island because it is not as exposed to the pollution found along the West Coast of the Island.

As its name suggests, the beach is inhabited by monkeys of the crab-eating macaque species. A variety of fauna and flora can be found within the park including green turtles, flying squirrels, flying lemurs and over 150 species of birds. On the beach itself the white-bellied sea eagle can often be spotted.

The beach can be reached either by a one and a half-hour hike along the coast or by a short boat ride from the park entrance. The calm bay of Monkey Beach is considered safe for swimming, unlike many beaches on the island that are infested with jellyfish. Although it is relatively isolated, visitors to the beach are not uncommon and numbers increase especially during the summer tourist season. A further half an hour uphill hike from the beach will take visitors to the scenic lighthouse.

A small isolated beach originally known as Monkey Beach. "Teluk Ketapang" is derived from the numerous sea almond trees known locally as Pokok Ketapang. This isolated beach can be easily accessed by boat from Teluk Bahang jetty; alternatively you can try trail 1A-1B-1C-1D-2.

Pantai Kerachut

The other jungle trail leads to Pantai Kerachut, one of the most frequented beaches in the park. A suspension bridge connects the trail to the beach itself. The meromictic lake is the most prominent feature on the beach, and one of the three of its sort in Asia. located near the sea, it is fed by five rivers and the sea itself. This is a seasonal lake, and is only filled during the interchange of monsoon winds. At the far end of the beach is a turtle sanctuary, where turtle eggs are being incubated. A display area also exhibit specimens of marine life and occasionally turtle hatchlings.

Geological formations are also fascinating on this beach. Quartz veins and igneous rocks form most of its geology. Flora includes scarce plants growing on the lake in the drought season and several others striving for survival on gaps on the rocks. Monitor lizards are often seen on the beach. The lake itself features interesting ecology. Gastropods of great population dwell in the lake. Crabs and garoupas frequent the rock pools.

During the nutrition bloom from November to January, kelp blooms upon the rocks, attracting jellyfish to the shores. Turtles lay their eggs here all year round. The three species recorded to have shored are the green turtle, hawksbill turtle and olive-ridley turtle. gorgonian coral also grow in these waters.

From End of the World, follow the track along the coast until you cross a suspension bridge. Take the path on the left that leads away from the coast, or just use1A-6A-6B-6C/6D/6E. You should be able to reach Pantai Keracut in one hour and a half.

Teluk Kampi
Teluk Kampi has the longest beach in the park. There are many artefacts and past history. The tell-tale signs of trenches found along the northern coast indicates a defence post for the Japanese Army during World War 2. Teluk Kampi is another isolated beach that guarantees an easy and relaxing trip.

The most common trail is the one from Pantai Kerachut over Tanjung Kerachut and down to Teluk Kampi using trail 1A-6A-6B-6D-6E-8A-8B-8C.

Pantai Mas
Pantai Mas is a golden beach. Formally a coconut plantation, it is now an overgrown wasteland. Being very close to civilisation, mud and mangroves create a wilderness few people would like to go to. The difficulty in accessing Pantai Mas by sea could be the reason why dwellers abandoned their homes here.

Accessing Pantai Mas with fishing boats is only available during high tides. Alternative access is through the trails from United Hokkien Cemetery or the longer ridge trail starting from Teluk Bahang. The easier walking trail will be from Pantai Acheh village. It will take about 45 minutes, trail indication is 15A-15B-15C.

Canopy Walkway
The 250m long Canopy Walk at Penang National Park hovers 15m from the ground. It cost RM3,000 to construct. It allows visitors to view the lush forest from an interesting angle. Built on dipterocarp trees with only ropes for support, without the aid of a single nail, screw or bolt, the canopy walkway hovers above most of the rainforests below. The longest stretch is 45 metres while the shortest walkway is only 5 metres.

The walkway is only permissible to visitors who purchased their ticket at the park entrance. (Adults: RM5/ Children: RM3). The walkway will be closed during rainy seasons and bad weather. The canopy walkway links the two major trails in the park, and this is perhaps the most scenic trail in the park.

Trails
There are two major trails in the Park, leading to Muka Head lighthouse and Pantai Kerachut respectively. The trail branches of at Pasir Pandak Hut. The trail leading to Muka Head lighthouse stops at Teluk Tukun, where it branches off to the canopy walkway, where it then links to Pantai Kerachut or vice versa. The other trail that leads to Pantai Mas starts behind the United Hokkien Cemetery near Teluk Bahang. A second entrance in Balik Pulau has another trail that leads to Pantai Mas. There was a trail that leads to Bukit Telaga Batu, the highest point by elevation in the park which was closed down due to erosion.

The trails in the park are completely nature trails, with only little man made structure such as concrete steps to aid hikers. Most parts of the trails are soil and in parts mud. Certain muddy parts are paved with sand from nearby shores. Ropes are tied to trees to aid climbers on steep ascend and descents. Most steps are naturally formed from tree roots.

All trails are marked at their forks and along the way, visitors can mark their progress by reading of the distance markers. Rest huts are also provided along the trail.

Facilities
Proper camping ground and amenities provided by the authorities make camping a luxury. Bird watching should not be missed here. The natural swimming pools provide a good place for family outings and nature camps.

Access 
The entrance to the park is located at the fishing village of Teluk Bahang. It is approximately 30 minutes by road from Georgetown.

By own transport, drive through the North South Expressway, exit at the junction of Penang Bridge. Follow the road towards the direction of Batu Feringghi and continues to Teluk Bahang. Administrative Office of the Penang National Park is located at Jalan Hassan Abbas. Public transport to Teluk Bahang available at ferry terminal / KOMTAR or may use taxi services provided. Rapid Penang Bus 102 runs regularly from KOMTAR to the Penang National Park HQ in Teluk Bahang. One-way fare costs RM4.00 and journey time is around an hour. Boat can be hire from the Park HQ to Monkey Beach for RM40 per boat for one-way.

The main entrance to the park is through Teluk Bahang while the second entrance point located at Kuala Sungai Pinang, Balik Pulau. Recreational facilities for visitors are only available at Pantai Kerachut, Sungai/Teluk Tukun, Pasir Pandak, Teluk Aling, Teluk Duyung dan Muka Head Light House. A nature trail also looped around the unique meromictic lake at Pantai Kerachut.

Economic Value
In 2012, Penang National Park and ten other protected areas under the management of the Department of Wildlife and National Parks (DWNP)
attracted 1.3 million tourists, a 6.5% increase compared with 2011. This figure, which represents a 22.5% increase compared to 2011, is evidenced by 108,276 visits to PNP (DWNP 2012). At this moment, PNP only relies on the government’s budget allocation, and visitor entries into the park are free. Finding strategies for a diverse revenue steam can improve the protection, maintenance, and upgrades of natural attractions of PNP, but that is another challenge for park management. Diverse source(s) of income could reduce the park’s over-reliance on any one funding source. It can also help PNP to establish its financial self-sufficiency, which is beneficial for long-term sustainability of the park.

References

External links
 Official site
 Penang Sentral Global Website
 Penang National Park – One Stop Malaysia
 Tourism Malaysia – Penang National Park
 Forest Explorers

National parks of Malaysia
Geography of Penang
Protected areas established in 2003
Tourist attractions in Penang